Syzygium ramavarmae is a species of plant in the family Myrtaceae. It is native to Kerala and Tamil Nadu in India.

References

ramavarmae
Flora of Kerala
Flora of Tamil Nadu
Vulnerable plants
Taxonomy articles created by Polbot
Taxobox binomials not recognized by IUCN